WISE J0521+1025 is a nearby brown dwarf of spectral type T7.5, located in constellation Orion at approximately 5.0 pc (16.3 ly) from Earth.

It is also the nearest known T dwarf in the northern sky.

History of observations
WISE J0521+1025 was discovered by Bihain et al. by selection of sources with colours typical for T dwarfs from WISE All-Sky source catalogue and checking them for high proper motion using older surveys: 2MASS, DENIS, SDSS, SSS, DSS and UKIDSS. Three objects  among about ten candidates, including WISE J0521+1025, were selected for spectroscopic follow up with Large Binocular Telescope (LBT). October 9, 2012 Bihain et al. carried out follow up observations of WISE J0521+1025 with near-Infrared spectrograph LUCI 1 on LBT. June 25, 2013 Astronomy & Astrophysics received the discovery paper, which was accepted for publication 10 July 2013.

Distance
Distance of WISE J0521+1025 was estimated by Bihain et al. using mean absolute magnitudes of single T7.5 dwarfs, derived by Dupuy & Liu (2012) from trigonometric parallaxes: 5.0 ± 1.3 pc (16.3 ± 4.2 ly).

See also
List of nearest stars and brown dwarfs

Two other T dwarfs, announced in Bihain et al (2013):
 WISE J0457−0207 (T2)
 WISE J2030+0749 (T1.5)

Notes

References

Orion (constellation)
Brown dwarfs
T-type stars
WISE objects
20130625